The 1982–83 Segunda División B season was the 6th since its establishment. The first matches of the season were played on 4 September 1982, and the season ended on 22 May 1983.

Overview before the season
40 teams joined the league, including one relegated from the 1981–82 Segunda División and 6 promoted from the 1981–82 Tercera División. The composition of the groups was determined by the Royal Spanish Football Federation, attending to geographical criteria.

Relegated from Segunda División
Burgos CF

Promoted from Tercera División

Albacete Balompié
CD Binéfar
AD Parla
UD Poblense
Osasuna Promesas
CD Hospitalet

Group I

Teams
Teams from Andorra, Aragon, Asturias, Basque Country, Canary Islands, Castile and León, Catalonia, Galicia and Navarre.

League table

Results

Top goalscorers

Top goalkeepers

Group II
Teams from Andalusia, Aragon, Balearic Islands, Castile and León, Castilla–La Mancha, Catalonia, Ceuta, Extremadura, Madrid, Region of Murcia and Valencian Community.

Teams

League table

Results

Top goalscorers

Top goalkeepers

Segunda División B seasons
3
Spain